Chuncheon Citizen FC is a South Korean football club based in Chuncheon, Gangwon. The club plays in the K3 League, the third tier of South Korean football. Chuncheon FC's home stadium is Chuncheon Stadium.

History
Chuncheon FC founded in 12 December 2009.
Chuncheon FC relegated to K4 League in 2020, promoted to K3 League in 2022 after 2 years in K4 League via play-off finished 3rd place.

Current squad

Honours
K3 League
Runners-up (1): 2012

Season-by-season records

References

External links
 Chuncheon FC at Facebook

K3 League clubs
K4 League clubs
K3 League (2007–2019) clubs
Sport in Gangwon Province, South Korea
Association football clubs established in 2010
2010 establishments in South Korea